The 2008 Australian Drivers' Championship was a CAMS sanctioned national motor racing title which was contested concurrently with the 2008 Kumho Tyres Australian Formula 3 Championship. The championship winner was awarded the 2008 CAMS Gold Star. The 2008 championship was the 52nd Australian Drivers' Championship and the fourth to be contested with open wheel racing cars constructed in accordance with FIA Formula 3 regulations.  The season began on 3 February 2008 at Eastern Creek Raceway and finished on 21 September at Symmons Plains Raceway after eight rounds across four different states with two races per round.

The series was won by a British driver for the second time in three years, with James Winslow victorious after a season long battle with Leanne Tander, who was runner up by only a few points for the second year in a row. Chris Gilmour won the National Class from Irish driver Lee Farrell, while Andrew Mill clinched the Trophy Class with a round in hand.

Class structure
Drivers competed in three classes:
 Championship Class – restricted to cars constructed in accordance with the FIA Formula 3 regulations that applied between 1 January 1999 and 31 December 2007
 National Class – restricted to cars constructed in accordance with the FIA Formula 3 regulations that applied between 1 January 1999 and 31 December 2004
 Trophy Class – restricted to cars constructed in accordance with the FIA Formula 3 regulations that applied between 1 January 1995 and 31 December 2001

Points system
Championship points were awarded on a 20–15–12–10–8–6–4–3–2–1 basis to the top ten classified finishers in the Championship Class in each race. An additional point was awarded to the driver gaining the Championship Class pole position for each race and a further additional point was awarded to the driver setting the fastest lap in the Championship class in each race. To secure the "fastest lap" point the driver must have been declared finisher for that race.

The same point-score system was also used for both the National Class and the Trophy Class.

Teams and drivers
The following teams and drivers competed during the 2008 Australian Formula 3 season. The listing relates to both the 2008 Australian Drivers' Championship and to the non-championship Indy F3 Challenge races. 

'* - John Martin, Zahir Ali, Carlos Huertas & Jonathan Grant contested the non-championship Indy F3 Challenge races but did not contest rounds of the 2008 Australian Drivers' Championship.

Race calendar

Results and standings

Drivers championship

Note: Race 2 of Round 1 was abandoned due to torrential rain and no points were awarded.

Indy F3 Challenge
The Indy F3 Challenge was a three race support event for Australian Formula 3 cars at the 2008 Nikon Indy 300 meeting at the Surfers Paradise Street Circuit. It was not a round of the 2008 Australian Drivers' Championship.

See also
 Australian Drivers' Championship
 Australian Formula 3

References

External links
 Official Australian Formula 3 website
 Results - 2008 Kumho Tyres Australian Formula 3 Championship for the CAMS Gold Star at replay.web.archive.org
 2008 Race result archive at www.natsoft.com.au
 Image of James Winslow (Team BRM Dallara F307) contesting the Symmons Plains round of the championship

Australian Drivers' Championship
Drivers' Championship
Australian Formula 3 seasons
Australia
Australian Formula 3